Ekaterine "Eka" Zguladze (Ekaterina Zguladze-Glucksmann; , ; born 18 June 1978) is a Georgian and Ukrainian government official. She served as First Deputy Minister of Internal Affairs of Ukraine since 17 December 2014 till 11 May 2016. She had served as Georgia's First Deputy Minister of Internal Affairs from 2006 to 2012 and Acting Minister of Internal Affairs in 2012.

Early life and education 
Ekaterine Zguladze was born in Tbilisi, the capital of then-Soviet Georgia. She studied law at the Oklahoma State University and eventually graduated from the Tbilisi State University with a degree in international journalism.

Career

In Georgia 
Zguladze worked for several international organizations based in Tbilisi and, from 2004 to 2005, the United States foreign aid agency Millennium Challenge Corporation – Georgia. At the invitation of the then-Minister of Internal Affairs of Georgia, Ivane Merabishvili, Zguladze, then 27 years old, became First Deputy Minister of Internal Affairs in the administration of President Mikheil Saakashvili in May 2006. After Merabishvili's successor, Bachana Akhalaia, resigned in response to an inmate abuse scandal in Tbilisi's Gldani prison on 19 September 2012, Zguladze was appointed Acting Minister of Internal Affairs and served on this position until the opposition Georgian Dream coalition, victorious in the October parliamentary election, formed a new government on 25 October 2012.

During her tenures in the ministry, Zguladze helped carry out sweeping police reforms that earned praise in the West. She was also the ministry's spokesperson on a range of issues, including during negotiations with foreign diplomats, and briefed the media during the tense days of the August 2008 war with Russia. In a classified U.S. diplomatic dispatch from 2007 published by WikiLeaks, Zguladze was described as "a tireless bureaucrat… sharp, and sometimes slightly sharp-edged, knowledgeable and a fierce debater".

In Ukraine 
On 17 December 2014, Zguladze was appointed as First Deputy Minister of Internal Affairs of Ukraine. Earlier that month, the President of Ukraine Petro Poroshenko granted her Ukrainian citizenship to make her eligible for the post. She is the second former Georgian official, after Alexander Kvitashvili, appointed to a Ukrainian government position in 2014. On her plans for police reform, she stated, "We're not producing cosmetic changes; we need to create a brand new system of law enforcement." On 5 July 2015, 2,000 new patrol police replaced Kyiv's old traffic police, completely overhauled with new western-inspired uniforms. In September 2015, Zguladze said, "I'm a firm believer that Western values, Western democracy, and Western aspirations are the way for Georgia … and for Ukraine."

On 11 May 2016 Zguladze resigned as First Deputy Minister to lead an ad hoc group of advisers to the interior minister. Following this she gave up Ukrainian citizenship and became a citizen of Georgia again.

Personal life 
In addition to her native Georgian, Zguladze is fluent in Russian and English. Her second husband, whom she married in 2011, is the French journalist and film director Raphaël Glucksmann (born 1979), who is a son of the French philosopher and writer André Glucksmann and a former adviser to ex-President Saakashvili. The couple has a son born in 2011. They subsequently divorced.

References 

1978 births
21st-century women politicians from Georgia (country)
21st-century politicians from Georgia (country)
Politicians from Tbilisi
Tbilisi State University alumni
Ukrainian government officials
Naturalized citizens of Ukraine
Living people
Georgian emigrants to Ukraine
21st-century Ukrainian women politicians
Recipients of the Presidential Order of Excellence